Christmas Wish is the twenty-second studio album by British-Australian singer Olivia Newton-John. It is the second original album of Christmas music recorded by Newton-John after Tis the Season with Vince Gill (Hallmark, 2000), and the compilation partly from that, The Christmas Collection. It is her second album produced by Amy Sky. It features versions of classic Christmas songs and guest appearances from Barry Manilow, Jon Secada, Michael McDonald and others. In 2008, the album was re-released as a Target exclusive and included the bonus track "In the Bleak Midwinter".

Critical reception

AllMusic editor Stephen Thomas Erlewine called Christmas Wish'' a "clean, low-key affair, where her versions of traditional Christmas carols [...] are interspersed with brief instrumental interludes. Nothing here is too high-energy, it sometimes borders on the sleepy, but as background holiday mood music, it is effective."

Track listing
All tracks produced by Amy Sky.

PersonnelPerformers and musicians Olivia Newton-John – vocals, harmony vocals (9)
 Greg Johnston – keyboards (1, 5, 7, 15), guitars (15), bass guitar (15)
 Mark Lalama – acoustic piano (1, 5, 11, 13, 21, 23), keyboards (7)
 Roman SebastIan – keyboards (2, 6, 8, 10, 12, 14, 16, 18, 20)
 David Foster – keyboards (3), acoustic piano (3), string arrangements (3)
 Mark Masri – keyboards (4), backing vocals (15, 21)
 Jim Brickman – acoustic piano (7)
 Steven MacKinnon – acoustic piano (9), accordion (9)
 Stephen Moccio – keyboards (17, 19), acoustic piano (17, 19)
 Jamie Oakes – guitars (7, 11, 23), dobro (11)
 Pavlo Simtikidis – guitar (10)
 Andy Timmons – guitars (21)
 George Koller – bass guitar (1, 5, 7, 11, 21, 23), dilruba (23)
 Mark Kelso – percussion (1, 5, 11, 23), drums (7, 15, 19, 21)
 Ron Korb – low whistle (1), tin whistle (1), bansuri (5), bass flute (11), C flute (11)
 Paul Widner – cello (4, 9, 11)
 Amy Shulman – harp (13, 19)
 Stephanie O'Keefe – French horn (13, 19)
 Warren Ham – saxophone (21)
 Phil Manos – orchestration (3), orchestral arrangements (13, 19)
 The Westlake Players – orchestra (13, 19)
 Robbie Buchanan – arrangements (22), string arrangements and conductor (22)
 Zoe Sky Jordan – backing vocals (1)
 Lauren Mayer – backing vocals (1)
 Amy Sky – backing vocals (1, 5, 11, 15, 17, 21, 23), arrangements (1, 5, 11, 13, 23), French backing vocals (11), keyboards (12, 15)
 Jon Secada – vocals (3)
 Marc Jordan – backing vocals (5), harmony vocals (19)
 Jann Arden – vocals (11)
 Steve Real – Spanish backing vocals (11)
 Michael McDonald – vocals (13)
 Amoy Levy – backing vocals (15, 21)
 Barry Manilow – vocals (22), arrangements (22)Technical Amy Sky – producer (1–21, 23), additional production (22)
 Robbie Buchanan – producer (22)
 Barry Manilow – producer (22)
 Steve Addabbo – recording 
 Jim "Pinky" Beeman – recording 
 David Bryant – recording 
 Zack Fagan – recording 
 Vic Florencia – recording, mixing (1–21, 23), additional mixing (22)
 Brian Friedman – recording 
 Humberto Gatica – recording 
 Michael Jack – recording 
 Jared Kvitka – recording 
 Michael Medina – recording
 Ted Onyszczak – recording 
 Bill Schnee – recording, mixing (22)
 Dustin Su – recording 
 Brian Wohlgemuth – recording 
 Matthew Zimmerman – recording
 Steve Crowder – recording assistant 
 Scott Erickson – recording assistant 
 Rocky Grisez – recording assistant 
 Greg Kolchinsky – recording assistant 
 Greg Johnston – additional engineer 
 Mark Kelso – additional engineer 
 Steven MacKinnon – additional engineer 
 Azra Ross – additional engineer 
 Joao Carvalho – mastering 
 Paul Jarmon – creative direction
 Megan Schaefer – art direction 
 Jennifer Bergstrom – graphic design 
 Michael Caprio – cover design 
 J. Michael Lafond – photographyStudios'''
 Recorded at Concrete Jungle, Lenz Entertainment, Phase One Studios, Silverbirch Productions, Hey World Studios and The Nucleus (Toronto, Ontario, Canada); Chartmaker Studios, The Cat's Room and The Document Room (Malibu, California); Capitol Studios (Hollywood, California); Gari Entertainment (Westlake, California); Shelter Island Sound (New York City, New York); Ocean Way Recording (Nashville, Tennessee); Wild Sound (Minneapolis, Minnesota); Palace Cleaners (Irving, Texas).
 Mixed at Concrete Jungle
 Mastered at Joao Carvalho Mastering (Toronto, Ontario, Canada).

Charts

References

External links
 

Olivia Newton-John albums
2007 Christmas albums
Christmas albums by Australian artists
Pop Christmas albums